Samireddy Palli is a village near Yadamari, Chittoor District, Andhra Pradesh, India.  The village is famous for milk and mangoes.

Villages in Chittoor district